FANG Man (Chinese:方满) is a Chinese-born American composer.

Compositions

Orchestral
That Raindrops have Hastened the Falling Flowers III (In memory of Steven Stucky) for Sheng, Cello and Chamber Orchestra (2019)
Feng (Wind) for Piano, Percussion and Wind Ensemble (2013)
Deluge 洪水 for Large Ensemble with Live Electronics (2008-9)
Resurrection 重生 for Clarinet and Chamber Orchestra with Live Electronics (2008-9)
Sketch 素描 for Orchestra (2008)
Noir 黑  for Orchestra (2005)
Aqua 水蓝 In Memoriam Toru Takemitsu for Large Orchestra (2003-4)
Lavender 薰衣草 for Soprano and Chamber Orchestra (2004)
Who will bell the cat? 谁去系铃 for Children Band (1998)

Chamber
Lament 悲歌 for Solo Bassoon (2017)
That Raindrops have Hastened the Falling Flowers II (In memory of Steven Stucky) for Flute and Piano (2017)
That Raindrops have Hastened the Falling Flowers I (In memory of Steven Stucky) for Solo Piano (2016)
A Folktale of the Four Dragons 四龙传说 II for Solo Flute (2013)
A Folktale of the Four Dragons 四龙传说 I for Flute and String Quartet (2012)
Earth: Song Cycle for Soprano, Bass-baritone and Sextet (2012)
Tao 道 for sheng and violoncello (2009–10)
Images of 7 Flowers ANNETTE Suite 花之印象 for Organ (2006)
Maroon 棕栗色 for Sextet (2005–06)
Larkspur 飞燕草 for Flute, Viola and Harp (2004)
Thirsty Stone II 渴石 II for Violin Duo (2004)
Dark Blue 深蓝 for Piano four-hands and Tape (2003)
Pure White 纯白 for Mallet Quartet (2002)
Thirsty Stone 渴石 for Violin Duo and Drumset (2002)
Big Red II 大红 II for Piano Duo (2001)
Folk Songs 民歌 for Solo Cello (2001)
String Quartet No.1 第一弦乐四重奏 for String Quartet (1999)
To one unnamed 鼓孤桐 for 7 Chinese Instruments (1998)
Ban Qiang Melody 板腔调 (Big Red) for Piano Solo (1996)

Electronics
Deluge 洪水 for Large Ensemble with Live Electronics (2008-9)
Resurrection 重生 for Clarinet and Chamber Orchestra with Live Electronics (2008-9)
Ambush From Ten Sides 十面埋伏 for Guitar(s) and Live Electronics (2007)

Film
Cotton Road 棉花之路 A Documentary Film by Laura Kissel (2014)

External links
Composer's website
 New York Times Review
Composer Portrait at Carnegie Hall
American Composers Orchestra Interview
American Music Center Interview

References 

Living people
1977 births
Cornell University alumni
American women composers
University of South Carolina faculty
Baldwin Wallace University faculty
Duke University faculty
Central Conservatory of Music alumni
21st-century American women musicians